Rated-FT is a Japanese-language studio album by South Korean rock band F.T. Island, released on 12 June 2013 by Warner Music Japan. The album features songs composed and written by members of the band, namely Time To, Hold My Hand, Black Chocolate and Orange Sky. The album opened at 3rd place on the Oricon daily chart and lead the Yamamoto Music Korea-Asia weekly chart.

Track listing

References

F.T. Island albums
2013 albums
Warner Music Japan albums